66652 Borasisi, or as a binary (66652) Borasisi-Pabu, is a binary classical Kuiper belt object. It was discovered in September 1999 by Chad Trujillo, Jane X. Luu and David C. Jewitt and identified as a binary in 2003 by K. Noll and colleagues using the Hubble Space Telescope.

Satellite

In 2003 it was discovered that 66652 Borasisi is a binary with the components of comparable size (about 100–130 km) orbiting the barycentre on a moderately elliptical orbit. The total system mass is about 3.4 kg.

The orbit is inclined with respect to the observer by about 54° meaning that is about 35° from the pole-on position.

Physical properties
The surface of both components of the Borasisi–Pabu system is very red.

Naming

Borasisi is named after a fictional creation deity taken from the novel Cat's Cradle by Kurt Vonnegut. In the book, Borasisi is the Sun and Pabu is the name of the Moon:

Borasisi, the sun, held Pabu, the moon, in his arms and hoped that Pabu would bear him a fiery child. But poor Pabu gave birth to children that were cold, that did not burn... Then poor Pabu herself was cast away, and she went to live with her favorite child, which was Earth.

Exploration
Around 2005, Borasisi was considered as a target for the proposed New Horizons 2 after a Triton/Neptune flyby.

References

External links 
 IAUC 8143
 

066652
Discoveries by Chad Trujillo
Discoveries by Jane Luu
Discoveries by David C. Jewitt
Named minor planets
Binary trans-Neptunian objects
19990908